Élise Bruyère (1776–1847) was a French painter who specialized in portraits and floral still lifes.

Bruyère was the daughter of Jean-Jacques-François Le Barbier (1738–1836), a noted French writer, illustrator, and painter of French historical scenes. Her sister Henriette was also a painter. Bruyère was of the Realist school of French painting, she had studied with Jean-Baptiste Jacques Augustin and Jan Frans van Dael and her still lifes, particularly her paintings of flowers, are remarkably detailed.  A typical work, Vase de fleurs, is in the Musée du Louvre in Paris.

References

Bibliography 

 Ferdinand Hoefer, Nouvelle Biographie Générale, vol. 30, Paris: Firmin-Didot, 1859, p. 63-4.
 Théodore-Éloi Lebreton, Biographie Rouennaise, Rouen: Le Brument, 1865, p. 207-8.
 Noémi Noire Oursel, Nouvelle Biographie Normande, Paris: Picard, 1886, p. 63.

1776 births
1847 deaths
18th-century French painters
19th-century French painters
French women painters
19th-century French women artists
18th-century French women artists
Sibling artists